Cheese in the Trap is a South Korean manhwa series written and illustrated by Soonkki. The webtoon was released on Internet portal Naver WEBTOON since 2010, and the first volume in print was published on March 2, 2012. It was adapted into a television series of the same name, which started airing on January 4, 2016. A film of the same name was also released on March 14, 2018.

Plot summary 
Model student, Hong Seol returning to college from a long break and finds herself caught up with Yoo Jung, a senior who's also known as Mr. Perfect. Seol feels like her life took a turn for the worse since Jung came into her life. The story focuses on a group of university students, especially the delicate relationship between female protagonist, Seol and Jung. Hong-Seol is studious and a hard working overachiever who has to works part time to make her ends meet. Jung is the rich and heir to Taerang Group and is seemingly perfect. Although, he is nice and kind to everyone around him, he is quite manipulative by using people around him to destroy others that irritate him. Seol decides to take time off school to be away from Jung as life had started to become so miserable. But she gets a call from school and returns by getting a scholarship that was intended for Jung. On returning, he is unexpectedly nice to her and asks her out on a date. Although she isn't sure what kind of person he is, they begin an awkward relationship that is complicated by the distance between them as well as the aftermath of his various schemes. The situation is further complicated by the arrival of In-ho Baek and his sister In-ha Baek, childhood friends of Jung who have since had a fall-out.

Media

In Japan, the webtoon was published into physical books by Kadokawa with the characters' names and nationalities changed to Japanese. To promote the Japanese release of volumes 7 and 8, a preview was released on YouTube with Aoi Yuki voicing Yuki Akayama (Hong Seol) and Yoshimasa Hosoya voicing Jun Aota (Yoo Jung).

References

External links
 Cheese in the Trap official website on Naver 
 Official English translation on WEBTOON

Manhwa titles
Naver Comics titles
2010 webtoon debuts
South Korean webtoons
Romantic comedy comics
Mystery comics
Comedy webtoons
Drama webtoons
Romance webtoons
School webtoons
Manhwa adapted into television series
2010s webtoons
Webtoons in print